Petropavlovka is a rural locality (a village) in Burunovsky Selsoviet, Gafuriysky District, Bashkortostan, Russia. The population was 3 as of 2010. There is 1 street.

Geography 
Petropavlovka is located 30 km southwest of Krasnousolsky (the district's administrative centre) by road. Burunovka is the nearest rural locality.

References 

Rural localities in Gafuriysky District